Georges Philippe may refer to:

 Georges Philippe (chess player) (1935-2010), Luxembourgian chess player
 Philippe de Rothschild (1902-1988), member of the Rothschild banking dynasty

Philippe, Georges